The 2012–13 season was West Bromwich Albion's third consecutive season in the Premier League, and their seventh in total. During the season, they also competed in the League Cup and the FA Cup. The club enjoyed their best ever season in the Premier League, finishing eighth in the league with a club record 49 points and 14 wins.

Their manager for the season was Steve Clarke, after former manager Roy Hodgson left to manage the England national team.

Players

First-team squad
Squad at end of season

Left club during season

Transfers

In

Out

On loan

Match results

Pre-season friendlies

Premier League

Football League Cup

FA Cup

Squad statistics

^On loan

Statistics accurate as of 30 September 2012

Notes

References

West Bromwich Albion F.C. seasons
West Bromwich Albion